Robert Rondinelli (born July 27, 1955) is a rock drummer best known for his work with the hard rock/heavy metal bands Blue Öyster Cult, Rainbow, Quiet Riot, Black Sabbath, The Lizards, The Handful, and Rondinelli. In July 2013, Rondinelli was announced as the new drummer for the Axel Rudi Pell band, replacing previous drummer Mike Terrana. Rondinelli has played on subsequent albums and tours, and remains with the band at time of writing (February 2016).

Equipment
Rondinelli plays Ludwig drums, Attack drumheads, and Paiste cymbals.

Drums: Ludwig:

Rondinelli plays on a standard size Ludwig set that usually comprises a bass, snare, rack tom, and two floor toms, although he may periodically slightly alter his setup depending on the artist he is playing with and the venue.

Cymbals: Paiste: 
 Signature 10" micro hi-hat 
 2002 17" crash 
 2002 15" sound edge hi-hats 
 2002 18" china 
 2002 19" crash 
 2002 10" splash 
 Giant Beat 24" Giant Beat ride 
 2002 18" crash 
 2002 18" novo china 
 Noise Works 14"/18" trash set 
 Twenty 18" thin china

Discography

References

External links
Black Sabbath Fan Site

1955 births
Living people
Musicians from Brooklyn
American heavy metal drummers
American people of Italian descent
Black Sabbath members
Blue Öyster Cult members
Quiet Riot members
Rainbow (rock band) members
20th-century American drummers
American male drummers
Riot (band) members
Warlock (band)